Dan Laurin (1960 in Jönköping, Sweden) is a Swedish recorder player.

Life and career
He studied under Ulla Wijk, Paul Nauta and Eva Legêne at the Conservatories of Odense and Copenhagen from 1976 to 1982. Since 1980 he has been on the concert stage, performing and recording with the Drottningholm Baroque Ensemble, Bach Collegium Japan, Berlin Philharmonic Orchestra, the Polish ensemble 'Arte dei Suonatori', and many other ensembles, with regular tours to Japan, the United States, Israel, Australia and across Europe. His work as a performing musician is complemented by an active teaching schedule including professorships at The Carl Nielsen Academy of Music, Odense; The Conservatory of Music in Gothenburg, Sweden and the Royal Conservatory of Music in Copenhagen. More recently Laurin was appointed professor of the recorder and teaches at Stockholm's Royal College of Music and at Trinity College in London.  He researches and lectures on many areas of interpretation, music aesthetics, recorder acoustics, sound techniques, and performance issues.

Laurin can plausibly be said to be one of the greatest players of the recorder active today. He has explored and widened the sonic possibilities of the recorder and has an unequalled technical facility. His playing explores a wide palette of tonal colours and a striking control of dynamics; the expressiveness of his playing is marked by a freedom in moving from the mutest pianissimo to a clear forte within hairbreadth spaces of time.  His interpretations combine thoughtful musical structure with highly wrought ornamentation and a sometimes wild sense of fantasy. His command of improvisation within a strong understanding of harmonic structure brings to 17th- and 18th-century music something of the spirit of jazz masters such as Charlie Parker, but Laurin's interpretations remain sensitive to the aesthetic and spirit of older music, as his many thoughtful essays on his repertoire reveal. Laurin's unique interpretative style is exhibited perhaps at its strongest in his many recordings of Vivaldi, culminating in a recording of the Four Seasons released in August 2006. His efforts to broaden the repertoire and to gain for the recorder the status of a concert instrument together with a large orchestra has resulted in several concertos that are already considered classics. His 1994 album The Swedish Recorder earned him a prize from the Swedish Association of Composers. This, along with three other albums (The Japanese Recorder, Vivaldi Recorder Concertos and Telemann/Bach (Fantasias/Solo works)) resulted in a Grammy award. Commissions include recorder concertos by Daniel Börtz, Henrik Strindberg, Fredrick Österling, as well as by Chiell Meijering, Vito Palumbo and Christofer Elgh.

Laurin is a member of the Royal Swedish Academy of Music, and in 2001 he received the medal 'Litteris et Artibus' from the King of Sweden. In 2011, he received the "Interpretation Prize" from the Royal Swedish Academy of Music.

Laurin collaborated with the Australian instrument maker Fred Morgan to advance recorder design, and this resulted in a succession of reconstructions of instruments from earlier times, including an instrument that was designed specifically for Laurin's 9-CD recording of Jacob van Eyck's monumental Der Fluyten Lust-hof (BIS-CD-775/780), the largest work ever written for a wind instrument. Laurin has trained some of the leading young recorder virtuosi in Europe and beyond.

Laurin is married to harpsichord and piano player Anna Paradiso.

References

External links
Official website
Short biography at BIS.se

1960 births
Recorder players
Swedish male musicians
Litteris et Artibus recipients
Living people